Acacia saxatilis is a shrub of the genus Acacia and the subgenus Phyllodineae that is endemic to south western Australia

Description
The glabrous and angular branchlets have caducous stipules. Like most species of Acacia it has phyllodes rather than true leaves. It blooms from September to October and produces yellow flowers.

Taxonomy
The species was first formally described by the botanist Spencer Le Marchant Moore in 1920 as a part of the work A contribution to the Flora of Australia as published in the  Journal of the Linnean Society, Botany. It was reclassified as Racosperma saxatile by Leslie Pedley in 2003 then transferred back to genus Acacia in 2006.

Distribution
It is native to an area in the Wheatbelt and Mid West regions of Western Australia.
where is found growing in clay, loam, sandy loam, and gravelly sandy clay soils. It has a scattered distribution from around Kalbarri in the north west down to around Coorow in the south and Bruce Rock in the south east where it is usually a part of open Eucalyptus woodland communities.

See also
 List of Acacia species

References

saxatilis
Acacias of Western Australia
Plants described in 1920
Taxa named by Spencer Le Marchant Moore